Climate change in the Maldives is a major issue for the country. As an archipelago of low-lying islands and atolls, many parts of the Maldives are threatened by sea level rise, with some predictions suggesting most of the nation will become uninhabitable during the 21st century. The country is striving to adapt to climate change, and Maldivian authorities have been prominent in international political advocacy to implement climate change mitigation.

Sea level rise 

Climate change severely threatens the existence of the Maldives, as an archipelago of low-lying islands and atolls in the Indian Ocean. According to the World Bank, with "future sea levels projected to increase in the range of 10 to 100 centimeters by the year 2100, the entire country could be submerged". By 2050, 80% of the country could become uninhabitable due to global warming. In 1988, Maldivian authorities claimed that rising seas could entirely cover the nation within the next 30 years.

The Intergovernmental Panel on Climate Change's 2007 report predicted the upper limit of the sea level rises will be  by 2100, which means that most of the republic's 200 inhabited islands may need to be abandoned. According to researchers from the University of Southampton, the Maldives are the third most endangered island nation due to flooding from climate change as a percentage of population.

In 2020, a three-year study at the University of Plymouth which looked at the Maldives and the Marshall Islands, found that tides move sediment to create a higher elevation, a morphological response that the researchers suggested could help low lying islands adjust to sea level rise and keep them islands habitable. The research also reported that sea walls were compromising islands’ ability to adjust to rising sea levels and that island drowning is an inevitable outcome for islands with coastal structures like sea walls. Hideki Kanamaru, natural resources officer with the Food and Agriculture Organization in Asia-Pacific, said the study provided a "new perspective" on how island nations could tackle the challenge of sea-level rise, and that even if islands can adapt naturally to higher seas by raising their own crests, humans still needed to double down on global warming and protection for island populations.

Effects on people 
Most people in the Maldives live on small, flat, densely populated atolls that are threatened by violent storms or even the slightest sea level rise. The capital Malé is especially threatened because it is on a small, flat, extremely densely populated atoll that is surrounded by sea walls, and other barriers to protect against storms. This means the Malé atoll cannot change shape in response to rising sea levels and is increasingly reliant on expensive engineering solutions.

Climate change will also have significant implications for tourism in the Maldives.

Effects on the environment 

Coral reefs in the Maldives are impacted by climate change. The 2016 global coral bleaching event greatly impacted coral reefs across the country, with such events expected to become more frequent and severe due to climate change.

Mitigation and adaptation

Mitigation 
In 2009, President Mohamed Nasheed announced a plan to make the country carbon neutral and pursue a renewable energy transition in the following decade. Maldives planned to eliminate or offset all of its greenhouse gas emissions. At the 2009 International Climate Talks, Nasheed explained that:For us swearing off fossil fuels is not only the right thing to do, but it is also in our economic self-interest... Pioneering countries will free themselves from the unpredictable price of foreign oil; they will capitalise on the new green economy of the future, and they will enhance their moral standing giving them greater political influence on the world stage.In 2017, the government of Abdulla Yameen changed the policy, instead aiming to be a low carbon country and prioritising development. Environment minister Thoriq Ibrahim said "We are going nowhere. The dream [of making the Maldives carbon neutral] is over. We are looking to be a low-carbon country."

Adaptation 

To defend against climate change and the resulting sea level rise, the national government of the Maldives has prepared a comprehensive National Adaptation Programme of Action, that attempts to critically consider and alleviate many of the serious threats the Maldives faces. The Maldives have already implemented several measures to combat sea level rise, including building a wall around the capital Malé and refurbishing local infrastructure, particularly ports. The country began a large-scale land reclamation project in Hulhumalé in the late 1990s, partly in preparation for relocation from elsewhere in the country. Also a Dutch company has proposed building 5000 floating homes near Malé.

In 2008, Nasheed announced plans to look into purchasing new land in India, Sri Lanka, and Australia because of his concerns about global warming, and the possibility of much of the islands being inundated by the rising sea. The purchase of land will be made from a fund generated by tourism. The president explained his intentions: "We do not want to leave the Maldives, but we also do not want to be climate refugees living in tents for decades".

International cooperation 

Advocacy for climate change mitigation is a key component of the country's foreign policy. President Nasheed said in 2012 that "If carbon emissions continue at the rate they are climbing today, my country will be under water in seven years." He has called for more climate change mitigation action while on the American television shows The Daily Show and the Late Show with David Letterman, and hosted "the world's first underwater cabinet meeting" in 2009 to raise awareness of the threats posed by climate change. Concerns over sea level rise were also expressed by Nasheed's predecessor, Maumoon Abdul Gayoom.

Former President of the Maldives Maumoon Abdul Gayoom said in 2016 "to the three hundred thousand inhabitants of the Maldives none of these threats compare, in magnitude and likelihood, to global climate change and consequent sea level rise." Former environment minister for the Maldives, Mohamed Aslam, said "If Maldives can do it, you can do it. It's important to us not just to talk but to lead by example".

Society and climate change

Public opinion 
A 2017 study of Maldivians' public opinion on climate change found that "more than 50% of respondents perceive future sea-level rise to be a serious challenge at the national level and they accept that migration from islands to other countries might be a potential option", although religious and cultural factors played a role.

See also 

 Effects of climate change on island nations
 Climate change in South Asia
 Malé Declaration on the Human Dimension of Global Climate Change
 The Island President

References

External links
 Maldives Summary at World Bank Climate Change Knowledge Portal
Preparing for Rising Seas in the Maldives at NASA Earth Observatory
Video: "The Maldives - vulnerabilities and climate change challenges" by Ministry of Environment

Environment of the Maldives
Maldives
Maldives
Geography of the Maldives
Politics of the Maldives